Plexaura is a genus of gorgonian-type octocorals in the family Plexauridae.

Medical research 

Plexaura is a coral that has a large amount of prostaglandins making it a great natural source of a compound called Prostaglandin A2. Prostaglandins can be extracted from Plexaura using dichloromethane/methanol and a rotary evaporator.Research indicates that Prostaglandin A2 may have activity against cancer. Under laboratory conditions prostaglandin A2 was able to inhibit enzymes present in some cancer cells. Prostaglandin A2 has shown to have cytotoxic activity towards both breast cancer and lung cancer cells. Treatment with prostaglandin A2 was also found to have major benefits for lung endothelial cells. Increasing recovery rates, decreasing inflammation and enhancing the endothelial cell barrier. This compound may have the potential to help people suffering from a respiratory infection recover quicker and easier with less chance of another infection due to the strengthening of the endothelial cell barrier.

Species
The World Register of Marine Species lists these species:

Plexaura aggregata Nutting, 1910
Plexaura arbuscula Duchassaing, 1850
Plexaura atra (Verrill, 1901)
Plexaura attenuata Nutting, 1910
Plexaura capoblancoi Stiasny, 1936
Plexaura corticosa Duchassaing & Michelotti, 1860
Plexaura dubia Kölliker, 1865
Plexaura edwardsi Moser, 1921
Plexaura ehrenbergi Kölliker, 1865
Plexaura esperi Verrill, 1907
Plexaura flava Nutting, 1910
Plexaura flavida (Lamarck, 1815)
Plexaura flexuosula Kükenthal, 1917
Plexaura fusca Duchassaing & Michelotti, 1860
Plexaura hartmeyeri Moser, 1921
Plexaura homomalla (Esper, 1792)
Plexaura kukenthali Moser, 1921
Plexaura kuna Lasker, Kim & Coffroth, 1996
Plexaura laevigata Moser, 1921
Plexaura miniacea Ehrenberg, 1834
Plexaura nina Bayer & Deichmann, 1958
Plexaura pinnata Nutting, 1910
Plexaura porosa (Esper, 1794)
Plexaura racemosa Valenciennes, 1855
Plexaura ramosa Moser, 1921
Plexaura turgida (Ehrenberg, 1834)
Plexaura valenciennesi Wright & Studer, 1889
Plexaura volvata Kunze, 1917

References

Plexauridae
Octocorallia genera